Jalikan-e Sofla (also Romanized as Jalīkān-e Soflá; also known as Jalīkān-e Pā’īn) is a village in Mianrud Rural District, Chamestan District, Nur County, Mazandaran Province, Iran. At the 2006 census, its population was 878, in 227 families.

References 

Populated places in Nur County